Johann Sebastian Bach composed the church cantata , 76 in Leipzig for the second Sunday after Trinity of the liturgical year and first performed it on 6 June 1723.

Bach composed the cantata at a decisive turning point in his career. Moving from posts in the service of churches and courts to the town of Leipzig on the first Sunday after Trinity, 30 May 1723, he began the project of composing a new cantata for every occasion of the liturgical year. , performed a week later, has the same structure.

The unknown poet begins his text with a quotation from Psalm 19 and refers to both prescribed readings from the New Testament, the parable of the great banquet as the Gospel, and the First Epistle of John. Bach scored Part I with a trumpet as a symbol of God's Glory. In Part II, performed after the sermon and during communion, he wrote chamber music with oboe d'amore and viola da gamba, dealing with "brotherly devotion". Both parts are closed with a stanza of Martin Luther's hymn "" (1524).

Background 
He was 38 years old and had a reputation as an organist and organ expert. He had composed church cantatas, notably the funeral cantata  around 1708.

History and words 
The cantata is similar in many respects to the earlier work. While BWV 75 was probably begun in Köthen, this cantata may have been composed in Leipzig, according to a manuscript with many corrections. The two cantatas mark the beginning of Bach's first "annual cycle": he started to compose one cantata for each Sunday and holiday of the liturgical year, a project described by Christoph Wolff as "an artistic undertaking on the largest scale".

The prescribed readings for the Sunday were from the First Epistle of John, "Whoever doesn't love, remains in Death", and from the Gospel of Luke, the parable of the great banquet. The unknown poet was likely the same as for the first cantata for Leipzig, also in 14movements, also arranged in two symmetrical parts to be performed before and after the sermon. Again the cantata begins with words from a Psalm,  (verses 2 and 4 in the Luther Bible), "The heavens declare the glory of God, and the firmament shows His handiwork. There is no speech or language, where their voice is not heard", connecting the Gospel to the Old Testament. The poet first expands in movements 2 and 3 the thought of the Universe praising God's creation. In the following two movements he deplores, following the Gospel, that nonetheless people did not follow the invitation of God, therefore he had to invite "" (from all streets) and bless those, as movement 6 says. Part I closes with the first stanza of Luther's chorale "" (1524), a paraphrase of Psalm 67. Part I was to be performed before the sermon, Part II after the sermon and during communion. Part II talks about the duties of those who follow God's invitation, to pass the love of Christ in order to achieve heaven on earth, a thought also expressed in the Epistle reading. The third stanza of Luther's chorale closes the work.

John Eliot Gardiner, who conducted the Bach Cantata Pilgrimage with the Monteverdi Choir in 2000, evaluated the work, connected to Bach's first cantata for Leipzig: this cantata is clearly more than just a sequel to the previous Sunday's ... together they form a diptych revealing a thematic continuity extended over two weeks, with plentiful cross-referencing between the two set Gospels and Epistles beyond the obvious parallels between the injunction to give charitably to the hungry (BWV 75) and of brotherly love manifested in action (BWV 76). He described the works as featuring "a characteristically Lutheran interpretation" of the First Epistle of John. He also noted the depth of metaphorical uses of "eating and drinking", highlighting "the rich man's table, from which Lazarus tried to gather fallen crumbs (BWV 75), standing in opposition to the "great supper" and God's invitation through Christ to the banquet of eternal life (BWV 76)". Summarising both pieces, Gardiner wrote:

Music

Scoring and structure 
The cantata is structured in two parts of seven movements each, to be performed before and after the sermon. It is scored for four vocal soloists (soprano (S), alto (A), tenor (T) and bass (B)), a four-part choir SATB, trumpet (Tr), two oboes (Ob), oboe d'amore (Oa), two violins (Vl), viola (Va), viola da gamba (Vg) and basso continuo (Bc). The two parts of seven movements each are composed as the same arrangement of alternating recitatives and arias with a concluding chorale, only Part II is opened by a sinfonia instead of a chorus. The duration is given as 35 minutes.

In the following table of the movements, the scoring follows the Neue Bach-Ausgabe. The keys and time signatures are taken from Alfred Dürr, using the symbol for common time (4/4). The instruments are shown separately for winds and strings, while the continuo, playing throughout, is not shown.

Movements 

Similar to the opening chorus of BWV 75, Bach sets the psalm in two sections, comparable to a prelude and fugue on a large scale. An instrumental concerto unites the complete "prelude", the trumpet "calls" to tell the glory of God. Joseph Haydn later set the same words, also in C major, in his oratorio The Creation.

In the first recitative the strings accompany the voice, most keenly in motifs in the arioso middle section, in Gardiner's words "to evoke the spirit of God moving upon the face of the waters". Trumpet and bass voice are used to convey the call "to banish the tribe of idolaters", while the strings possibly illustrate "the hordes of infidels". The last recitative leads in an arioso to the chorale. In the chorale, Bach has the violin play an obbligato part to the four-part setting of the voices and separates the lines by interludes, with the trumpet anticipating the line to follow. The continuo plays ostinato a motif which is derived from the first line of the chorale.

Whereas Part I begins with a trumpet announcing ("") God's glory, Part II starts on an intimate chamber music scale with oboe d'amore and viola da gamba, concentrating on "brotherly devotion". A sinfonia in E minor for these two instruments is reminiscent both of Bach's compositions for the court in Köthen and of a French overture, marked "adagio", then "vivace". Bach used the music of this movement later in his organ sonata, BWV 528. Gardiner calls the movement "in effect a sonata da chiesa". The tenor aria illustrates the "masochistic" "Hate me, then, hate me with all your might, o hostile race!" by a first dissonant entry on an ostinato bass line full of chromatic, leaps and interrupting rests. Oboe d'amore and viola da gamba return to accompany the last aria, and "the sombre qualities of both voice and instruments create a feeling of peace and introspection". The music of the closing chorale is identical to that of Part I.

Recordings 

A list of recordings is provided by Aryeh Oron on the Bach Cantatas Website. Ensembles playing period instruments in historically informed performance are shown with green background.

References

Sources 
 
 Die Himmel erzählen die Ehre Gottes BWV 76; BC A 97 / Sacred cantata (2nd Sunday after Trinity) Bach Digital
 BWV 76 Die Himmel erzählen die Ehre Gottes: English translation, University of Vermont
 BWV 76 Die Himmel erzählen die Ehre Gottes: text, scoring, University of Alberta
 Cantata No. 76, "Die Himmel erzählen die Ehre Gottes," BWV 76 (Allmusic)
 Luke Dahn: BWV 76.7=76.14 bach-chorales.com

Church cantatas by Johann Sebastian Bach
Psalm-related compositions by Johann Sebastian Bach
1723 compositions
Compositions with natural trumpets in D